The subgenus Siphlodora belongs to genus Drosophila and consists of two species that share a sigmoid-shaped posterior crossvein. Phylogenetically, the subgenus is positioned within the virilis-repleta radiation.

References 

 Siphlodora